Howard Paul may refer to:
Henry Howard Paul, Victorian era actor and theatre manager, with the stage name Howard Paul
Mrs Howard Paul, Victorian actress and singer who was married for a time to Henry Howard Paul
Howard R. Paul, American businessman and musician